The Scottish Civic Trust is a registered charity. Founded in 1967, and based in the Category A-listed Tobacco Merchant's House in Glasgow, the Trust aims to provide "leadership and focus in the protection, enhancement and development of Scotland's built environment". It often comments on planning applications. From 1990 to 2011 the Trust maintained the Buildings at Risk Register for Scotland on behalf of Historic Environment Scotland and delivers the popular Doors Open Days programme in Scotland. The current director of the Trust is Susan O'Connor.

See also
Cockburn Association (Edinburgh Civic Trust)
Doors Open Days Scotland
Architectural Heritage Society of Scotland
Cambusnethan House

References

External links
 
 Buildings at Risk Register for Scotland

1967 establishments in Scotland
Charities based in Glasgow
Buildings and structures in Scotland
Interested parties in planning in Scotland
Organizations established in 1967
Architectural conservation
Heritage organisations in Scotland
Architecture in Scotland
Civic societies in the United Kingdom